Codex Purpureus Beratinus designated by Φ or 043 (in the Gregory-Aland numbering), ε 17 (von Soden), is an uncial illuminated manuscript Gospel book written in Greek. Dated palaeographically to the 6th-century, the manuscript is written in an uncial hand on purple vellum with silver ink. The codex is preserved at the Albanian National Archives (Nr. 1) in Tirana, Albania. It was formerly possessed by the St. George Church in the town of Berat, Albania, hence the 'Beratinus' appellation.

Description 
Codex Beratinus contains only the Gospel of Matthew and the Gospel of Mark, with several considerable lacunae (Matthew 1:1-6:3, 7:26-8:7, 18:23-19:3, and Mark 14:62-end). The codex contains 190 extant parchment leaves measuring 31.4 × 26.8 cm, or approximately the same size as those of Codex Alexandrinus, and have two columns per page, but the letters are much larger. It is written with 17 lines per page, 8-12 letters per line, in very regular letters, in silver ink. The title and the first line in Mark are written in gold. The writing is continuous in full lines without stichometry. Quotations from the Old Testament are marked with an inverted comma (<).

The numerals of the Ammonian sections are given on the left margin, and a references to the Eusebian Canons were added by a later hand in the 8th century. A note in the manuscript states that the loss of the other two Gospels is due to "the Franks of Champagne", i.e. some of the Crusaders, who may have seen it while at Patmos, where it was believed formerly to have been.

Text 
The Greek text of the codex is generally of the Byzantine text-type, but it contains the long Western addition after Matthew 20:28, occurring also in Codex Bezae: Aland gave for it the following textual profile: 1311, 831/2, 112, 18s.

"But seek to increase from that which is small, and to become less from which is greater. When you enter into a house and are summoned to dine, do not sit down at the prominent places, lest perchance a man more honorable than you come in afterwards, and he who invited you come and say to you, "Go down lower"; and you shall be ashamed. But if you sit down in the inferior place, and one inferior to you come in, then he that invited you will say to you, "Go up higher"; and this will be advantageous for you."

In Matthew 21:9, the following interpolation occurs, sharing affinity only with syrcur:
και εξελθον εις υπαντησιν αυτω πολλοι χαιροντες και δοξαζοντες τον θεον περι παντων ων ειδον
And many went out to meet him; all who were seeing [him] round about were rejoicing and glorifying God.

In Matthew 27:9, in the phrase επληρωθη το ρηθεν δια Ιερεμιου του προφητου (fulfilled what was spoken by Jeremiah the prophet) the word Ιερεμιου (Jeremiah) is omitted, as in Minuscule 33, a, b, syrs, syrp, and copbo.

In Matthew 27:16 it has additional reading ος δια φονον και στασιν ην βεβλημενοις εις φυλακην (who for murder and insurrection had been thrown in prison).

In Matthew 27:35, it includes ἵνα πληρώθη τὸ ῤηθὲν διὰ τοῦ προφήτου, Διεμερίσαντο τὰ ἱμάτια μου ἑαυτοῖς καὶ ἐπὶ τὸν ἱματισμὸν μου ἔβαλον κλῆρον along with 0250, 037, 038, 1424, 1582, 124, 348, 788, 1279, 1579, and 517.

According to B. H. Streeter, Codex Beratinus is a tertiary witness of the Caesarean text. It is grouped with N, O, Σ, and Uncial 080 to constitute the Purple Uncials. Aland categorized the first four into Category V, and it is certain that they are more Byzantine than anything else. Aland did not categorize Uncial 080.

History 
Formerly it was believed to have been at Patmos. According to Xhevat Lloshi it came from Ballsh. It was held in Berat, Albania from 1356. The text of the codex was published by Pierre Batiffol in 1887. "During World War II, Hitler learned of it and sought it out. Several monks and priests risked their lives to hide the manuscript." Since 1971, it has been preserved at the National Archives of Albania in Tirana.

Oscar von Gebhardt designated it by siglum Φ, which is often used in critical editions.

Importance as Cultural Heritage
The Codex Purpureus Beratinus was inscribed on the UNESCO’s Memory of the World Register in 2005 in recognition of its historical significance. The two Beratinus codices preserved in Albania are very important for the global community and the development of ancient biblical, liturgical and hagiographical literature and are part of the "seven purple codices", which were written over a period of 13 centuries, i.e. from the sixth to the eighteenth centuries. The other five "purple codices" are in Italy (two), France (one), England (one), and Greece (one).

See also 

 List of New Testament uncials
 Textual criticism
 Purple parchment

References

External links 
 Online Hi-Res images at the CSNTM.
 R. Waltz, Codex Beratinus Φ (043), Encyclopedia of Textual Criticism.
 
 Website of Unesco
 Kodikët e Shqipërisë (’Albániai kódexek’)

Further reading 

 Pierre Batiffol, Evangeliorum codex Graecus purpureus Beratinus Φ, in: Mélanges d'archéologie et d'histoire, de l'école française de Rome 5 (Paris and Rome, 1882), pp. 358–376.
 
 
 
 Shaban Sinani, Kodikët e Shqipërisë dhe 2000-vjetori i krishtërimit, in: "Media", 2000/6.

History of Berat
Beratinus
Purple parchment
6th-century biblical manuscripts
Memory of the World Register
Gospel Books
6th-century illuminated manuscripts
Medieval documents of Albania